Korea National Railroad College was a national university located in Uiwang, South Korea. In 2012 it merged with Chungju National University into Korea National University of Transportation

References

External links
 

Educational institutions established in 1905
Educational institutions disestablished in 2012
Defunct universities and colleges in South Korea
1905 establishments in Korea